Martín Eduardo Zúñiga Barrios (born 14 April 1993) is a Mexican professional footballer who plays as a forward.

Career statistics

Club

1FIFA Club World Cup

Honours
América
Liga MX: Clausura 2013, Apertura 2014
CONCACAF Champions League: 2014-15

Cruz Azul
Copa MX: Apertura 2018

Mexico Youth
Central American and Caribbean Games: 2014
Pan American Silver Medal: 2015

Individual
CONCACAF Champions League: Best Young Player 2014–15

References

External links
 
 
 
 

Living people
1993 births
Association football forwards
Club América footballers
Liga MX players
Footballers from Chiapas
Mexican footballers
Footballers at the 2015 Pan American Games
Pan American Games medalists in football
Pan American Games silver medalists for Mexico
Medalists at the 2015 Pan American Games